Frode Håre (born 10 December 1972) is a retired Norwegian ski jumper.

In the World Cup he finished once among the top 10, with a tenth place from Sapporo in January 1995.

After retiring he has been working as a ski jumping coach. He has coached Anders Jacobsen among others.

References

1972 births
Living people
Norwegian male ski jumpers
People from Buskerud
Norwegian ski jumping coaches
Sportspeople from Viken (county)